Isinko is a rural municipality in Madagascar. It belongs to the district of Tsaratanana, which is a part of Betsiboka Region. It is situated at the Isinko river.

References

Populated places in Betsiboka